Elachista abiskoella is a moth of the family Elachistidae. It is found in Sweden and Finland.

The wingspan is 8–9 mm.

References

abiskoella
Moths described in 1977
Moths of Europe